In astrophysics, a BzK galaxy is a galaxy that has been selected as star-forming or passive based on its photometry in the B, z, and K photometric bands.

The selection criteria, as originally defined, are as follows:
 Star-forming BzK (sBzK) galaxies satisfy: 
 Passive BzK (pBzK) galaxies satisfy:  and

See also 
 Lyman-break galaxy

References 

Galaxies